Bouteloua curtipendula, commonly known as sideoats grama, is a perennial, short prairie grass that is native throughout the temperate and tropical Western Hemisphere, from Canada south to Argentina.

The species epithet comes from Latin  "shortened" and  "hanging".

Description

Sideoats grama is a warm-season grass.

The flowers bloom in summer and autumn. They consist of compact spikes that hang alternately in a raceme along the top  of the culm. The spikes often fall to one side of the stem, which gives the plant its name. There are 10–50 spikes per culm, and in each spike there are three to six spikelets, or rarely as many as 10. One of the florets is fertile, and has colorful orange to brownish red anthers and feathery white stigmas during the blooming period, which contrasts with the pale green, pale red, greenish-red, or purple color of the spikes themselves.

After blooming, the spikes become straw-colored. The fertile florets produce seeds, and when they are ripe, the spikes fall to the ground.

Distribution and habitat
Sideoats grama grows well on mountainous plateaus, rocky slopes, and sandy plains. It is drought- and cold-tolerant and is hardy in USDA hardiness zones 4–9 (average annual minimums of ).

Ecology
It provides larval food for the veined ctenucha (Ctenucha venosa).

Conservation
It is currently listed as a threatened species in the U.S. state of Michigan. It is considered as an endangered species in Connecticut.

Uses
Sideoats grama is considered a good foraging grass for livestock. It is planted for erosion control.

Cultivation
It is cultivated as an ornamental plant for native plant and drought-tolerant gardens.

Culture
Sideoats grama is the state grass of Texas.

References 

curtipendula
Grasses of North America
Grasses of South America
Grasses of Argentina
Grasses of Mexico
Grasses of the United States
Native grasses of the Great Plains region
Flora of the United States
Flora of Central America
Flora of the Chihuahuan Desert
Symbols of Texas
Taxa named by Mariano Lagasca
Garden plants of North America
Garden plants of South America
Drought-tolerant plants
Warm-season grasses of North America